Eslamabad (also Romanized as Eslāmābād) is a village in Manzariyeh Rural District, in the Central District of Shahreza County, Isfahan Province, Iran. At the 2006 census, its population was 4,489, in 997 families.

References 

Populated places in Shahreza County